Franz Karl Naegele (7 December 1778 – 21 January 1851) was a German obstetrician born in Düsseldorf. His son, Hermann Franz Naegele (1801–1851), was also a noted obstetrician.

He earned his medical degree from the University of Bamberg, afterwards opening a medical practice in Barmen. In 1807, he became an associate professor at the University of Heidelberg, where in 1810 he was appointed a full professor of obstetrics.

He is remembered for "Naegele's rule", a standard method of calculating the due date for a pregnancy. His name is also lent to "Naegele obliquity", also known as an anterior asynclitism.

A variety of obliquely contracted bony pelvis where there is arrested development of one of the sacral alae, has also been named after him (Naegele's pelvis).

Selected publications 

 Beytrag zu einer naturgeschichtlichen Darstellung der krankhaften Erscheinung am thierischen Körper, welche man Entzündung nennt, und ihre Folgen. Dänzer, Düsseldorf 1804. Digitalization by the University of Düsseldorf
  
  Translated into English by Edward Rigby in 1829 as An Essay on the Mechanism of Parturition. 
 
 
 Das schräg verengte Becken; nebst einem Anhange über die wichtigsten Fehler des weiblichen Beckens. (1839); translated into English in 1939 as "The obliquely contracted pelvis, containing also an appendix of the most important defects of the female pelvis".
 Lehrbuch der Geburtshülfe (1843) – Textbook of midwifery.
 "Ein Briefwechsel zwischen Joseph Alexis Stoltz und Franz Carl Naegele der XIII.: Versammlung der deutschen Gesellschaft für Gynäkologie 2.-5. Juni 1909 zum Empfang gewidmet von der Universitätsfrauenklinik Straßburg I. Els". J.H. Heitz, 1909 (Letters to and from Joseph-Alexis Stoltz)

References 
  ADB Deutsche Biographie
 Klinkhammer, Gisela. Ärztetags-Sonderstempel: Zu Ehren von Franz Karl Naegele Dtsch Ärztebl 2001; 98(22): [84] / [84] / [84] 

Academic staff of Heidelberg University
People from Düsseldorf
German obstetricians
1851 deaths
1778 births
University of Bamberg alumni
19th-century German physicians
Physicians from North Rhine-Westphalia